Piobesi Torinese is a comune (municipality) in the Metropolitan City of Turin in the Italian region Piedmont, located about 15 km southwest of Turin.

Piobesi Torinese borders the following municipalities: Candiolo, None, Vinovo, Castagnole Piemonte, and Carignano.

References

Cities and towns in Piedmont